Isiah Mansur Farmstead Historic District, also known as Rock Hall, is a historic home and farm and national historic district located near Richmond, Ray County, Missouri.  The district encompasses eight contributing buildings, one contributing site, and three contributing structures on a farm developed between the mid-19th and mid-20th centuries.  The contributing resources include the main farmhouse (1842, 1858 addition), a buggy house (c. 1905), a large barn (c. 1909), an engine house (c.1900), a small barn (c. 1920), a brooder house (c. 1920), a hen house (c. 1920), a smokehouse (c. 1935), a house well (c. 1840), a field well (c. 1934), and a wellhouse (also known as "the pump house," c. 1945).  The main farmhouse is a two-story, five bay, frame I-house.

It was listed on the National Register of Historic Places in 1998.

References

Historic districts on the National Register of Historic Places in Missouri
Farms on the National Register of Historic Places in Missouri
Houses completed in 1842
Buildings and structures in Ray County, Missouri
National Register of Historic Places in Ray County, Missouri